for the composer Galina Smirnova, see Galina Konstantinovna Smirnova

Galina Alexandrovna Smirnova (17 February 1929, Soligalich – 12 December 2015) was a Soviet Russian painter who lived and worked in Saint Petersburg. She was a member of the Saint Petersburg Union of Artists (before 1992 known as the Leningrad branch of Union of Artists of Russian Federation), regarded as one of representatives of the Leningrad school of painting, most famous for her portraits of contemporaries.

Biography 

Galina Alexandrovna Smirnova was born on 17 February 1929 in the town Soligalich, Kostroma Oblast of the Russian SFSR.

In the years 1944–1948 Galina Smirnova studied in Kostroma Art College.

In 1949 Galina Smirnova entered at the first course of Department of Painting at the Leningrad Institute of Painting, Sculpture and Architecture named after Ilya Repin, where she studied under Ivan Stepashkin, Vladislav Anisovich, and Mikhail Avilov.

In 1955 Galina Smirnova graduated from the Leningrad Institute of Painting, Sculpture and Architecture named after Ilya Repin in Yuri Neprintsev workshop together with Piotr Litvinsky, Evgeny Maltsev, Victor Reykhet, Yuri Belov, and other young artists.

Since 1955 Galina Smirnova has participated in Art Exhibitions. She paints portraits, genre scenes, landscapes, and still lifes.

In a creative sense, the most interesting are her portraits of contemporaries, as well as nature studies and genre paintings.

Galina Alexandrovna Smirnova is a member of the Saint Petersburg Union of Artists (before 1992 was known as the Leningrad branch of Union of Artists of Russian Federation) since 1960.

Paintings by Galina Alexandrovna Smirnova reside in Art museums and private collections in the Russia, France, Germany, and others.

See also 
 Leningrad School of Painting
 List of painters of Saint Petersburg Union of Artists
 Saint Petersburg Union of Artists

References

Bibliography 
 Peinture Russe. Catalogue. - Paris: Drouot Richelieu, 18 Fevrier, 1991. - p. 7,50.
 Peinture Russe. Catalogue. - Paris: Drouot Richelieu, 26 Avril, 1991. - p. 7,55.
 Matthew C. Bown. Dictionary of 20th Century Russian and Soviet Painters 1900-1980s. - London: Izomar, 1998. , .
 Sergei V. Ivanov. Unknown Socialist Realism. The Leningrad School.- Saint Petersburg: NP-Print Edition, 2007. – pp. 370, 393, 394, 396, 397. , .

1929 births
Living people
People from Soligalichsky District
20th-century Russian painters
21st-century Russian painters
Soviet painters
Socialist realist artists
Leningrad School artists
Members of the Leningrad Union of Artists
Painters from Saint Petersburg
Repin Institute of Arts alumni
Russian women painters
20th-century Russian women artists
21st-century Russian women artists